Buskala Creek is a stream in the U.S. state of South Dakota.

Buskala is a name derived from the Sioux language meaning "white logs".

See also
List of rivers of South Dakota

References

Rivers of Lawrence County, South Dakota
Rivers of South Dakota